The Postman Trade Union "Postman" (Serbian: Sindikat Dostavljača PTT pošiljaka "Poštar") is national trade union of postmen employed in Pošta Srbije, the national Post Office of the Republic of Serbia. It was formed December 2, 2008 by Goran Krsman and Dragan Ličina. It is the youngest trade union in Serbian Post Office.

References
 Decision of Ministry of Labour and Social Policy Republic of Serbia Number: 100-00-1026/2008-02 Belgrade, Serbia December 2, 2008.

Trade unions established in 2008
Postal trade unions
Economy of Serbia
2008 establishments in Serbia
Trade unions in Serbia